Ménil-de-Senones is a commune in the Vosges department in Grand Est in northeastern France.

The name Ménil-de-Senones dates only from August 1961, before which the commune was called Ménil. The name was officially changed in order to reduce the risk of confusion with another Vosges commune called Le Ménil.

See also
Communes of the Vosges department

References

Communes of Vosges (department)
Salm-Salm